Magic in Middle-earth is the use of supernatural power in J. R. R. Tolkien's fictional Middle-earth. Tolkien distinguishes ordinary magic from witchcraft, the latter always deceptive, stating that either type could be used for good or evil. 

Several of the races of Middle-earth are inherently able to work magic, from the godlike Ainur (including Wizards and Balrogs, both being members of the angelic race of Maiar) and the immortal Elves to Dragons and to some extent also Dwarves. Men and Hobbits could not directly work magic, but could make use of more or less magical artefacts made by others, such as Númenorean swords (made by Men with Elvish blood) and the Phial of Galadriel given to Frodo. Some of the magical artefacts were of great power, including the Palantíri or Stones of Seeing, but by far the most powerful was the One Ring, made by the Dark Lord Sauron and embodying much of his former power.

Scholars have written that Tolkien felt the need for a magical cosmology to counter modernity's war against mystery and magic. In the sense that magic is the use of power to dominate other people, it is evil, and associated in Tolkien's mind with technology. The opposite of that is enchantment, something that Frodo experiences in the Elvish realms of Rivendell and Lothlórien, both preserved by the power of the Three Elvish Rings. That too can be a trap, as the Elves are obliged to let their Rings and their realms fade, just as the Fellowship of the Ring have to let the One Ring go, its addictive power corrupting the wearer's mind to evil.

Appearances 

Middle-earth is described both as being quite natural, with the ordinary features of Earth's rivers, mountains and plains, trees and plants under the sky, and supernatural, with magical powers shared by many of its races of beings from Wizards to Dwarves, and a variety of magical artefacts from rings to impenetrable walls.

By race 

The various races of Middle-earth had differing powers:

By artefact 

Magical power is wielded through different artefacts:

Analysis

A magical cosmology 

The scholar and critic Patrick Curry argued that Tolkien felt the need for a magical cosmology combining polytheism and animism with Christian values like compassion and humility, to counter modernity's "war against mystery and magic". He believed that Tolkien considered magic as something negative, associated with modern science and machinery, as in his essay On Fairy-Stories: a means of "power ... [and] domination of things and wills" that corrupts those who use it, for example, trapping the wizard Saruman in his desire for ultimate knowledge and order. Such magic contrasts with the enchantment of Tolkien's fictional elvish lands, which he saw as a form of pure art and an appreciation of the wonders of the world.

Two kinds of magic 

In an unsent draft of a letter in 1954, Tolkien distinguished two kinds of magic with the Greek words μαγεία (mageia "ordinary magic") and γοητεία (goeteia, "witchcraft").

 Mageia involves the use of some mechanism, like speaking the proper words at a magic door, such as the Doors of Durin, to make it open. Sauron used it to create the dark cloud that covered Mordor and Gondor before the Battle of the Pelennor Fields. 

 Goeteia influences perception and will. The Elves used it to create artistic beauty without effort and without deception. Sauron used it to dominate the wills of his subjects.

Tolkien stated that these could not be acquired by studying ancient lore or books of spells, but that they were "inherent power not possessed or attainable by Men as such". He however qualified this by writing "But the Númenóreans used "spells" in making swords?" alongside the end of the letter explaining these points. He further explained that both Mageia and Goeteia could be used for good and bad purposes, but neither was inherently good or bad in itself. In his view, using them to control free will was the most extreme kind of evil.

Enchantment 

Curry states that enchantment is "the paradigmatic experience, property and 
concern of the Elves", as seen both in Rivendell when Frodo listens to the Elves' singing in the Hall of Fire, and even more strongly in Lothlórien:

Curry cites what he calls Max Weber's crucial insight, namely that "The unity of the primitive image of the world, in which everything was concrete magic [his italics], has tended to split into rational cognition and mastery of nature, on the one hand, and into 'mystic' experiences, on the other". In his view, enchantment heals the split, seen in Platonic, Christian, and Cartesian philosophy, between subjectivity and objectivity.

In the Tolkien scholar Verlyn Flieger's view, the attractive enchantment of the Elves might then seem entirely perfect; but she argues that this is not so. In her 2001 book A Question of Time, she writes that in Middle-earth, as in human life, any attempt to hold on to enchantment is doomed; the Elves are put to the test of letting Lórien's timeless beauty go, just as the members of the Fellowship of the Ring are put to the test of letting the Ring go. In Curry's view, this explains why the magical power of the three Elvish Rings too must fade when the One Ring is destroyed.

Deceptive in use 

A palantír could not be made to create false images, even by Sauron, but he could use one to selectively display truthful images to create a false impression in the viewer's mind. In each of the four uses of a stone in The Lord of the Rings, a true image is shown, but the viewer draws a false conclusion from the facts. This applies even to Sauron, when he sees Pippin in Saruman's stone and assumes that Pippin has the One Ring, and that Saruman has therefore captured it. Similarly, Denethor is deceived by Sauron, who drives Denethor to suicide by truthfully showing him the Black Fleet approaching Gondor, without telling him that the ships are crewed by Aragorn's men. The Tolkien scholar Tom Shippey suggests that Tolkien's message is that one should not try to double-guess the future through any device, but should trust in providence and make one's own mind up, bravely facing one's duty in each situation.

Addiction to power

The One Ring offers power to its wearer, and progressively corrupts the wearer's mind to evil; the effect is strongly addictive. Shippey applied Lord Acton's 1887 statement that "Power tends to corrupt, and absolute power corrupts absolutely. Great men are almost always bad men" to it, noting that this was a distinctively modern thought: contemporary authors such as George Orwell with Animal Farm (1945), William Golding with Lord of the Flies (1954), and T. H. White with The Once and Future King (1958) similarly wrote about the corrupting effects of power.

Wish-fulfilment

Shippey writes that there is a "streak of 'wish-fulfilment'" in the account of "The Scouring of the Shire". Merry returns from Rohan with a magic horn, brought from the North by Eorl the Young, founder of Rohan, from the dragon-hoard of Scatha the Worm. The horn, he explains, is "a magic one, though only modestly so": blowing it brings joy to his friends in arms, fear to his enemies, and it awakens the Hobbits to purify the Shire of Saruman's ruffians. Shippey suggests that Tolkien wished to do the same for England, and notes that with his novels he at least succeeded in bringing joy. The historian Caitlin Vaughn Carlos writes that Sam Gamgee's exclamation "This is worse than Mordor! ... It comes home to you, they say; because it is home, and you remember it before it was ruined" encapsulates the impulse to nostalgia.

References

Primary
This list identifies each item's location in Tolkien's writings.

Secondary

Sources 

 
 
  
 
 
 
 
 
 
 
 
 
 
 
 
 
 
 
 
 
 
 
 

Middle-earth
Middle-Earth
Themes of The Lord of the Rings